The lynching of Edward "Red" Roach was the extrajudicial killing of a 25-year-old Black man by a mob of White men in Roxboro, North Carolina for allegedly assaulting the 13-year-old daughter of popular White tobacco farmer Edward Chambers. Later, Nello Teer, Roach's employer, wrote to The Herald-Sun in Durham decrying the lynching as a “ghastly mistake” because Roach was at work when the alleged attack on Chambers occurred. No one was ever brought to justice for the lynching. A memorial service was held in Durham in remembrance of "Ed" Roach in 2019.

Lynching

In an orchard in Person County, North Carolina, July 7, 1920, the screams of Edward Chambers' daughter alerted people that she felt threatened by Red Roach. He was able to jump on a Norfolk and Western train at Helena, NC but was arrested by police at the next train stop. He was escorted back to Roxboro, North Carolina and put in jail. A White mob soon formed and stormed the jail dragging Roach to a tree in the courtyard of a church. He was shot to death. A rope was strung over a branch but it was too short so a chain was used to hang Red Roach to death. In the crowd watching was the 13-year-old daughter of tobacco farmer Edward Chambers. 

Red Roach was part of a work party fixing county roads. After his death, his working party refused to work out of fear they would be lynched by association.  After the lynching,  letters sent and published in The Crisis journal claimed that Roach was killed in a case of mistaken identity.

Red Summer of 1919

This uprising was one of several incidents of civil unrest that spiked during the so-called American Red Summer, of 1919. Terrorist attacks on black communities and white oppression in over three dozen cities and counties. In most cases, white mobs attacked African American neighborhoods. In some instances, black community groups resisted the attacks, especially in Chicago and Washington DC. Most deaths occurred in rural areas during events such as the Elaine Race Riot in Arkansas, where an estimated 100 to 240 black people and five white people were killed. Also in 1919 were the Chicago Race Riot and Washington D.C. race riot which killed 38 and 39 people respectively, and with both having many more non-fatal injuries and extensive property damage reaching  into the millions of dollars.

See also
Lynching of George Taylor in Rolesville, North Carolina
Lynn Council of  Wake County, North Carolina - In 1952, in an effort to get a confession, Lynn police stage a lynching
John W. Stephens was a state senator from North Carolina who was stabbed and garroted by the Ku Klux Klan on May 21, 1870, in the Caswell County Courthouse in Yanceyville, NC

Bibliography 
Notes

References 

 

 

African-American history between emancipation and the civil rights movement
White American riots in the United States
1920 riots in the United States
Racially motivated violence against African Americans
History of racism in North Carolina
1920 in North Carolina
July 1920 events
African-American history of North Carolina
Riots and civil disorder in North Carolina
Lynching deaths in North Carolina
1920 murders in the United States
People murdered in North Carolina
Anti-black racism in the United States 
Murdered African-American people
Deaths from fire in the United States